This is a partial list of unnumbered minor planets for principal provisional designations assigned during 16–31 October 2003. Since this period yielded a high number of provisional discoveries, it is further split into several standalone pages. , a total of 395 bodies remain unnumbered for this period. Objects for this year are listed on the following pages: A–E · F–G · H–L · M–R · Si · Sii · Siii · Siv · T · Ui · Uii · Uiii · Uiv · V · Wi · Wii and X–Y. Also see previous and next year.

U 

|- id="2003 UA430" bgcolor=#E9E9E9
| 0 ||  || MBA-M || 17.6 || 1.3 km || multiple || 1994–2021 || 16 Jan 2021 || 68 || align=left | — || 
|- id="2003 UB430" bgcolor=#fefefe
| 0 ||  || MBA-I || 18.7 || data-sort-value="0.54" | 540 m || multiple || 2003–2020 || 14 Dec 2020 || 73 || align=left | — || 
|- id="2003 UC430" bgcolor=#E9E9E9
| 0 ||  || MBA-M || 18.05 || 1.4 km || multiple || 2003–2021 || 06 Oct 2021 || 42 || align=left | — || 
|- id="2003 UD430" bgcolor=#fefefe
| 1 ||  || MBA-I || 18.8 || data-sort-value="0.52" | 520 m || multiple || 2003–2018 || 07 Mar 2018 || 36 || align=left | — || 
|- id="2003 UE430" bgcolor=#E9E9E9
| 0 ||  || MBA-M || 17.3 || 1.0 km || multiple || 1995–2021 || 15 Jan 2021 || 76 || align=left | — || 
|- id="2003 UF430" bgcolor=#E9E9E9
| 0 ||  || MBA-M || 17.67 || 1.2 km || multiple || 2003–2021 || 09 Dec 2021 || 56 || align=left | — || 
|- id="2003 UG430" bgcolor=#E9E9E9
| 0 ||  || MBA-M || 17.2 || 1.1 km || multiple || 2003–2021 || 03 Jan 2021 || 85 || align=left | — || 
|- id="2003 UH430" bgcolor=#fefefe
| 1 ||  || MBA-I || 18.74 || data-sort-value="0.53" | 530 m || multiple || 2003–2021 || 19 May 2021 || 76 || align=left | — || 
|- id="2003 UJ430" bgcolor=#E9E9E9
| 0 ||  || MBA-M || 17.95 || 1.4 km || multiple || 2003–2021 || 01 Nov 2021 || 50 || align=left | — || 
|- id="2003 UK430" bgcolor=#E9E9E9
| 1 ||  || MBA-M || 17.2 || 1.5 km || multiple || 2003–2020 || 16 Dec 2020 || 82 || align=left | — || 
|- id="2003 UL430" bgcolor=#E9E9E9
| 0 ||  || MBA-M || 17.2 || 1.5 km || multiple || 2003–2020 || 14 Nov 2020 || 66 || align=left | — || 
|- id="2003 UM430" bgcolor=#fefefe
| 0 ||  || MBA-I || 18.61 || data-sort-value="0.56" | 560 m || multiple || 2003–2021 || 03 Aug 2021 || 37 || align=left | — || 
|- id="2003 UN430" bgcolor=#E9E9E9
| 2 ||  || MBA-M || 18.1 || data-sort-value="0.71" | 710 m || multiple || 2003–2019 || 10 Jun 2019 || 36 || align=left | — || 
|- id="2003 UO430" bgcolor=#E9E9E9
| 0 ||  || MBA-M || 18.2 || data-sort-value="0.68" | 680 m || multiple || 1995–2021 || 15 Jan 2021 || 46 || align=left | Alt.: 1995 YV6 || 
|- id="2003 UP430" bgcolor=#fefefe
| 0 ||  || MBA-I || 18.7 || data-sort-value="0.54" | 540 m || multiple || 2003–2021 || 03 Jan 2021 || 69 || align=left | — || 
|- id="2003 UQ430" bgcolor=#d6d6d6
| 0 ||  || MBA-O || 16.44 || 2.9 km || multiple || 2003–2022 || 06 Jan 2022 || 136 || align=left | Alt.: 2010 AU108 || 
|- id="2003 UR430" bgcolor=#E9E9E9
| 0 ||  || MBA-M || 17.72 || 1.6 km || multiple || 2003–2021 || 08 Aug 2021 || 52 || align=left | — || 
|- id="2003 US430" bgcolor=#fefefe
| 0 ||  || HUN || 19.17 || data-sort-value="0.44" | 440 m || multiple || 2003–2021 || 09 May 2021 || 60 || align=left | — || 
|- id="2003 UT430" bgcolor=#E9E9E9
| 0 ||  || MBA-M || 17.82 || 1.5 km || multiple || 2003–2021 || 30 Oct 2021 || 57 || align=left | — || 
|- id="2003 UU430" bgcolor=#E9E9E9
| 0 ||  || MBA-M || 17.51 || 1.3 km || multiple || 2003–2021 || 08 Nov 2021 || 106 || align=left | — || 
|- id="2003 UV430" bgcolor=#fefefe
| 0 ||  || MBA-I || 18.82 || data-sort-value="0.51" | 510 m || multiple || 2003–2021 || 06 Nov 2021 || 82 || align=left | — || 
|- id="2003 UW430" bgcolor=#d6d6d6
| 0 ||  || MBA-O || 16.8 || 2.4 km || multiple || 2003–2020 || 08 Dec 2020 || 39 || align=left | — || 
|- id="2003 UX430" bgcolor=#fefefe
| 0 ||  || MBA-I || 18.55 || data-sort-value="0.58" | 580 m || multiple || 2003–2021 || 01 Oct 2021 || 53 || align=left | — || 
|- id="2003 UY430" bgcolor=#fefefe
| 1 ||  || HUN || 19.46 || data-sort-value="0.38" | 380 m || multiple || 2003–2018 || 09 Nov 2018 || 41 || align=left | — || 
|- id="2003 UZ430" bgcolor=#d6d6d6
| 0 ||  || MBA-O || 17.1 || 2.1 km || multiple || 2003–2020 || 15 Oct 2020 || 33 || align=left | — || 
|- id="2003 UB431" bgcolor=#fefefe
| 1 ||  || MBA-I || 18.7 || data-sort-value="0.54" | 540 m || multiple || 2003–2020 || 23 Sep 2020 || 51 || align=left | — || 
|- id="2003 UC431" bgcolor=#d6d6d6
| 0 ||  || MBA-O || 17.1 || 2.1 km || multiple || 2003–2020 || 05 Dec 2020 || 71 || align=left | — || 
|- id="2003 UD431" bgcolor=#d6d6d6
| 1 ||  || MBA-O || 17.6 || 1.7 km || multiple || 2003–2019 || 03 Dec 2019 || 35 || align=left | — || 
|- id="2003 UE431" bgcolor=#E9E9E9
| 0 ||  || MBA-M || 17.3 || 1.9 km || multiple || 2003–2020 || 14 Aug 2020 || 48 || align=left | — || 
|- id="2003 UF431" bgcolor=#fefefe
| 1 ||  || MBA-I || 18.8 || data-sort-value="0.52" | 520 m || multiple || 2003–2019 || 27 Oct 2019 || 77 || align=left | Alt.: 2019 OW16 || 
|- id="2003 UG431" bgcolor=#E9E9E9
| 1 ||  || MBA-M || 18.0 || 1.1 km || multiple || 2003–2020 || 24 Dec 2020 || 33 || align=left | — || 
|- id="2003 UH431" bgcolor=#d6d6d6
| 0 ||  || MBA-O || 16.9 || 2.3 km || multiple || 2003–2020 || 20 Dec 2020 || 37 || align=left | — || 
|- id="2003 UJ431" bgcolor=#d6d6d6
| 0 ||  || MBA-O || 16.2 || 3.2 km || multiple || 2003–2020 || 16 Nov 2020 || 77 || align=left | — || 
|- id="2003 UK431" bgcolor=#fefefe
| 2 ||  || MBA-I || 19.2 || data-sort-value="0.43" | 430 m || multiple || 2003–2017 || 22 Oct 2017 || 29 || align=left | — || 
|- id="2003 UM431" bgcolor=#E9E9E9
| 1 ||  || MBA-M || 18.3 || data-sort-value="0.65" | 650 m || multiple || 2003–2019 || 25 Jul 2019 || 32 || align=left | Alt.: 2010 NV139 || 
|- id="2003 UN431" bgcolor=#FA8072
| 1 ||  || HUN || 19.3 || data-sort-value="0.41" | 410 m || multiple || 2003–2020 || 14 Nov 2020 || 55 || align=left | — || 
|- id="2003 UO431" bgcolor=#fefefe
| 0 ||  || HUN || 19.16 || data-sort-value="0.44" | 440 m || multiple || 2003–2021 || 29 Nov 2021 || 82 || align=left | — || 
|- id="2003 UP431" bgcolor=#fefefe
| 2 ||  || MBA-I || 19.6 || data-sort-value="0.36" | 360 m || multiple || 2003–2021 || 04 Jan 2021 || 34 || align=left | — || 
|- id="2003 UQ431" bgcolor=#d6d6d6
| 0 ||  || MBA-O || 17.82 || 1.5 km || multiple || 2003–2022 || 06 Jan 2022 || 33 || align=left | — || 
|- id="2003 UR431" bgcolor=#fefefe
| 3 ||  || MBA-I || 19.4 || data-sort-value="0.39" | 390 m || multiple || 2003–2017 || 14 Nov 2017 || 21 || align=left | — || 
|- id="2003 US431" bgcolor=#E9E9E9
| 1 ||  || MBA-M || 18.5 || data-sort-value="0.84" | 840 m || multiple || 2003–2020 || 11 Oct 2020 || 25 || align=left | — || 
|- id="2003 UT431" bgcolor=#E9E9E9
| 0 ||  || MBA-M || 17.2 || 1.1 km || multiple || 2003–2021 || 17 Jan 2021 || 108 || align=left | — || 
|- id="2003 UU431" bgcolor=#E9E9E9
| 0 ||  || MBA-M || 17.0 || 1.2 km || multiple || 2003–2020 || 15 Dec 2020 || 119 || align=left | — || 
|- id="2003 UV431" bgcolor=#E9E9E9
| 0 ||  || MBA-M || 17.5 || data-sort-value="0.94" | 940 m || multiple || 2003–2019 || 01 Nov 2019 || 82 || align=left | — || 
|- id="2003 UW431" bgcolor=#d6d6d6
| 0 ||  || MBA-O || 16.4 || 2.9 km || multiple || 2003–2020 || 09 Dec 2020 || 90 || align=left | — || 
|- id="2003 UY431" bgcolor=#E9E9E9
| 0 ||  || MBA-M || 17.8 || data-sort-value="0.82" | 820 m || multiple || 2003–2019 || 03 Oct 2019 || 174 || align=left | — || 
|- id="2003 UA432" bgcolor=#fefefe
| 0 ||  || MBA-I || 18.24 || data-sort-value="0.67" | 670 m || multiple || 1993–2021 || 12 May 2021 || 127 || align=left | — || 
|- id="2003 UB432" bgcolor=#d6d6d6
| 0 ||  || MBA-O || 16.6 || 2.7 km || multiple || 2003–2019 || 01 Nov 2019 || 78 || align=left | — || 
|- id="2003 UC432" bgcolor=#d6d6d6
| 0 ||  || MBA-O || 16.51 || 2.8 km || multiple || 2003–2021 || 12 May 2021 || 133 || align=left | Alt.: 2010 GA61 || 
|- id="2003 UE432" bgcolor=#d6d6d6
| 0 ||  || MBA-O || 16.98 || 2.2 km || multiple || 2003–2021 || 18 Mar 2021 || 99 || align=left | — || 
|- id="2003 UF432" bgcolor=#E9E9E9
| 0 ||  || MBA-M || 17.47 || data-sort-value="0.95" | 950 m || multiple || 2003–2021 || 07 Apr 2021 || 88 || align=left | — || 
|- id="2003 UG432" bgcolor=#fefefe
| 0 ||  || MBA-I || 18.0 || data-sort-value="0.75" | 750 m || multiple || 2003–2020 || 21 Apr 2020 || 73 || align=left | — || 
|- id="2003 UH432" bgcolor=#fefefe
| 1 ||  || MBA-I || 18.5 || data-sort-value="0.59" | 590 m || multiple || 2003–2019 || 26 Nov 2019 || 78 || align=left | — || 
|- id="2003 UJ432" bgcolor=#fefefe
| 0 ||  || MBA-I || 18.5 || data-sort-value="0.59" | 590 m || multiple || 2003–2019 || 05 Oct 2019 || 169 || align=left | — || 
|- id="2003 UK432" bgcolor=#d6d6d6
| 0 ||  || MBA-O || 16.9 || 2.3 km || multiple || 2003–2020 || 12 Dec 2020 || 76 || align=left | — || 
|- id="2003 UM432" bgcolor=#fefefe
| 0 ||  || MBA-I || 18.2 || data-sort-value="0.68" | 680 m || multiple || 2003–2019 || 24 Oct 2019 || 67 || align=left | — || 
|- id="2003 UO432" bgcolor=#d6d6d6
| 0 ||  || MBA-O || 16.3 || 3.1 km || multiple || 2003–2021 || 15 Jan 2021 || 102 || align=left | — || 
|- id="2003 UQ432" bgcolor=#fefefe
| 0 ||  || MBA-I || 18.43 || data-sort-value="0.61" | 610 m || multiple || 2003–2022 || 27 Jan 2022 || 79 || align=left | — || 
|- id="2003 UU432" bgcolor=#fefefe
| 0 ||  || MBA-I || 19.0 || data-sort-value="0.47" | 470 m || multiple || 2003–2019 || 05 Feb 2019 || 95 || align=left | — || 
|- id="2003 UW432" bgcolor=#d6d6d6
| 0 ||  || MBA-O || 16.5 || 2.8 km || multiple || 1998–2021 || 17 Jan 2021 || 89 || align=left | — || 
|- id="2003 UX432" bgcolor=#d6d6d6
| 0 ||  || MBA-O || 16.52 || 2.8 km || multiple || 2003–2022 || 27 Jan 2022 || 79 || align=left | — || 
|- id="2003 UC433" bgcolor=#d6d6d6
| 0 ||  || MBA-O || 16.5 || 2.8 km || multiple || 2003–2020 || 08 Dec 2020 || 75 || align=left | — || 
|- id="2003 UE433" bgcolor=#d6d6d6
| 0 ||  || MBA-O || 16.9 || 2.3 km || multiple || 1998–2021 || 21 Jan 2021 || 75 || align=left | — || 
|- id="2003 UF433" bgcolor=#d6d6d6
| 0 ||  || MBA-O || 17.0 || 2.2 km || multiple || 2003–2021 || 08 Jan 2021 || 85 || align=left | — || 
|- id="2003 UG433" bgcolor=#d6d6d6
| 0 ||  || MBA-O || 17.1 || 2.1 km || multiple || 2003–2019 || 01 Nov 2019 || 56 || align=left | — || 
|- id="2003 UH433" bgcolor=#d6d6d6
| 0 ||  || MBA-O || 16.7 || 2.5 km || multiple || 2003–2021 || 12 Jan 2021 || 72 || align=left | — || 
|- id="2003 UJ433" bgcolor=#E9E9E9
| 0 ||  || MBA-M || 17.4 || data-sort-value="0.98" | 980 m || multiple || 2003–2019 || 27 Oct 2019 || 68 || align=left | — || 
|- id="2003 UL433" bgcolor=#d6d6d6
| 0 ||  || MBA-O || 16.6 || 2.7 km || multiple || 2003–2019 || 05 Nov 2019 || 54 || align=left | — || 
|- id="2003 UM433" bgcolor=#E9E9E9
| 0 ||  || MBA-M || 17.7 || 1.2 km || multiple || 2003–2020 || 06 Dec 2020 || 111 || align=left | — || 
|- id="2003 UN433" bgcolor=#fefefe
| 0 ||  || HUN || 19.18 || data-sort-value="0.43" | 430 m || multiple || 2003–2021 || 20 Apr 2021 || 68 || align=left | — || 
|- id="2003 UO433" bgcolor=#d6d6d6
| 0 ||  || MBA-O || 17.3 || 1.9 km || multiple || 2003–2020 || 19 Jan 2020 || 68 || align=left | — || 
|- id="2003 UP433" bgcolor=#d6d6d6
| 0 ||  || MBA-O || 16.8 || 2.4 km || multiple || 2003–2019 || 29 Oct 2019 || 54 || align=left | — || 
|- id="2003 UQ433" bgcolor=#d6d6d6
| 0 ||  || MBA-O || 16.6 || 2.7 km || multiple || 2003–2021 || 17 Jan 2021 || 67 || align=left | — || 
|- id="2003 US433" bgcolor=#E9E9E9
| 0 ||  || MBA-M || 17.60 || 1.7 km || multiple || 2003–2021 || 08 Sep 2021 || 53 || align=left | — || 
|- id="2003 UU433" bgcolor=#d6d6d6
| 0 ||  || MBA-O || 16.32 || 3.0 km || multiple || 2003–2021 || 15 May 2021 || 126 || align=left | Alt.: 2010 FF106 || 
|- id="2003 UW433" bgcolor=#E9E9E9
| 0 ||  || MBA-M || 17.6 || 1.3 km || multiple || 2003–2020 || 05 Nov 2020 || 93 || align=left | — || 
|- id="2003 UX433" bgcolor=#fefefe
| 0 ||  || MBA-I || 19.1 || data-sort-value="0.45" | 450 m || multiple || 2003–2019 || 24 Jul 2019 || 52 || align=left | — || 
|- id="2003 UY433" bgcolor=#fefefe
| 0 ||  || MBA-I || 17.94 || data-sort-value="0.77" | 770 m || multiple || 2003–2021 || 13 May 2021 || 53 || align=left | — || 
|- id="2003 UA434" bgcolor=#d6d6d6
| 0 ||  || MBA-O || 16.2 || 3.2 km || multiple || 2003–2021 || 06 Jan 2021 || 76 || align=left | — || 
|- id="2003 UC434" bgcolor=#E9E9E9
| 1 ||  || MBA-M || 17.5 || data-sort-value="0.94" | 940 m || multiple || 2003–2021 || 18 Jan 2021 || 66 || align=left | — || 
|- id="2003 UD434" bgcolor=#d6d6d6
| 0 ||  || MBA-O || 16.7 || 2.5 km || multiple || 2003–2021 || 17 Jan 2021 || 64 || align=left | — || 
|- id="2003 UE434" bgcolor=#d6d6d6
| 0 ||  || MBA-O || 17.0 || 2.2 km || multiple || 2003–2019 || 04 Dec 2019 || 59 || align=left | — || 
|- id="2003 UF434" bgcolor=#d6d6d6
| 1 ||  || MBA-O || 17.2 || 2.0 km || multiple || 2003–2019 || 28 Nov 2019 || 58 || align=left | — || 
|- id="2003 UM434" bgcolor=#d6d6d6
| 0 ||  || MBA-O || 17.0 || 2.2 km || multiple || 2003–2019 || 03 Oct 2019 || 49 || align=left | — || 
|- id="2003 UO434" bgcolor=#E9E9E9
| 2 ||  || MBA-M || 18.3 || data-sort-value="0.65" | 650 m || multiple || 2003–2019 || 01 Jun 2019 || 49 || align=left | — || 
|- id="2003 UP434" bgcolor=#d6d6d6
| 0 ||  || MBA-O || 16.9 || 2.3 km || multiple || 2003–2020 || 25 Jan 2020 || 65 || align=left | — || 
|- id="2003 UR434" bgcolor=#E9E9E9
| 0 ||  || MBA-M || 17.69 || 1.2 km || multiple || 2003–2022 || 24 Jan 2022 || 98 || align=left | — || 
|- id="2003 UT434" bgcolor=#E9E9E9
| 0 ||  || MBA-M || 17.2 || 1.5 km || multiple || 2003–2020 || 08 Nov 2020 || 90 || align=left | — || 
|- id="2003 UU434" bgcolor=#fefefe
| 0 ||  || MBA-I || 17.8 || data-sort-value="0.82" | 820 m || multiple || 2003–2019 || 02 Jan 2019 || 53 || align=left | — || 
|- id="2003 UV434" bgcolor=#fefefe
| 0 ||  || MBA-I || 18.5 || data-sort-value="0.59" | 590 m || multiple || 2003–2020 || 10 Nov 2020 || 69 || align=left | — || 
|- id="2003 UW434" bgcolor=#fefefe
| 0 ||  || HUN || 18.69 || data-sort-value="0.54" | 540 m || multiple || 2003–2021 || 20 May 2021 || 79 || align=left | — || 
|- id="2003 UX434" bgcolor=#fefefe
| 0 ||  || MBA-I || 19.03 || data-sort-value="0.46" | 460 m || multiple || 2003–2021 || 08 May 2021 || 67 || align=left | — || 
|- id="2003 UY434" bgcolor=#fefefe
| 0 ||  || MBA-I || 18.75 || data-sort-value="0.53" | 530 m || multiple || 2003–2021 || 08 Sep 2021 || 57 || align=left | — || 
|- id="2003 UZ434" bgcolor=#fefefe
| 0 ||  || MBA-I || 18.6 || data-sort-value="0.57" | 570 m || multiple || 2003–2019 || 05 Jul 2019 || 64 || align=left | — || 
|- id="2003 UA435" bgcolor=#E9E9E9
| 1 ||  || MBA-M || 18.7 || data-sort-value="0.54" | 540 m || multiple || 2003–2019 || 27 Nov 2019 || 47 || align=left | — || 
|- id="2003 UB435" bgcolor=#d6d6d6
| 1 ||  || HIL || 16.3 || 3.1 km || multiple || 2003–2019 || 28 Nov 2019 || 47 || align=left | — || 
|- id="2003 UC435" bgcolor=#d6d6d6
| 0 ||  || MBA-O || 17.25 || 2.0 km || multiple || 2003–2021 || 15 Apr 2021 || 59 || align=left | — || 
|- id="2003 UD435" bgcolor=#E9E9E9
| 1 ||  || MBA-M || 17.97 || data-sort-value="0.76" | 760 m || multiple || 2003–2021 || 10 Apr 2021 || 65 || align=left | — || 
|- id="2003 UE435" bgcolor=#fefefe
| 1 ||  || MBA-I || 18.4 || data-sort-value="0.62" | 620 m || multiple || 2003–2019 || 16 Dec 2019 || 49 || align=left | — || 
|- id="2003 UF435" bgcolor=#d6d6d6
| 0 ||  || MBA-O || 16.7 || 2.5 km || multiple || 2003–2021 || 10 Jan 2021 || 54 || align=left | — || 
|- id="2003 UG435" bgcolor=#d6d6d6
| 0 ||  || MBA-O || 16.4 || 2.9 km || multiple || 2003–2019 || 30 Nov 2019 || 49 || align=left | — || 
|- id="2003 UH435" bgcolor=#fefefe
| 0 ||  || MBA-I || 18.90 || data-sort-value="0.49" | 490 m || multiple || 2003–2021 || 14 May 2021 || 69 || align=left | — || 
|- id="2003 UJ435" bgcolor=#E9E9E9
| 0 ||  || MBA-M || 17.7 || data-sort-value="0.86" | 860 m || multiple || 2003–2020 || 10 Dec 2020 || 53 || align=left | — || 
|- id="2003 UK435" bgcolor=#d6d6d6
| 0 ||  || MBA-O || 16.8 || 2.4 km || multiple || 2003–2019 || 28 Nov 2019 || 43 || align=left | — || 
|- id="2003 UL435" bgcolor=#fefefe
| 0 ||  || MBA-I || 17.99 || data-sort-value="0.75" | 750 m || multiple || 2003–2021 || 03 May 2021 || 79 || align=left | — || 
|- id="2003 UM435" bgcolor=#fefefe
| 0 ||  || MBA-I || 18.1 || data-sort-value="0.71" | 710 m || multiple || 2003–2020 || 17 Dec 2020 || 83 || align=left | — || 
|- id="2003 UN435" bgcolor=#E9E9E9
| 0 ||  || MBA-M || 17.58 || 1.7 km || multiple || 2003–2021 || 24 Oct 2021 || 210 || align=left | — || 
|- id="2003 UO435" bgcolor=#fefefe
| 1 ||  || MBA-I || 18.6 || data-sort-value="0.57" | 570 m || multiple || 2003–2018 || 11 Nov 2018 || 41 || align=left | — || 
|- id="2003 UP435" bgcolor=#fefefe
| 0 ||  || MBA-I || 19.00 || data-sort-value="0.47" | 470 m || multiple || 2003–2021 || 30 Sep 2021 || 48 || align=left | — || 
|- id="2003 UQ435" bgcolor=#E9E9E9
| 0 ||  || MBA-M || 17.92 || 1.1 km || multiple || 2003–2022 || 25 Jan 2022 || 59 || align=left | — || 
|- id="2003 US435" bgcolor=#fefefe
| 0 ||  || MBA-I || 18.73 || data-sort-value="0.53" | 530 m || multiple || 2003–2021 || 09 Dec 2021 || 78 || align=left | — || 
|- id="2003 UT435" bgcolor=#fefefe
| 0 ||  || MBA-I || 18.56 || data-sort-value="0.58" | 580 m || multiple || 2003–2021 || 30 Jun 2021 || 61 || align=left | — || 
|- id="2003 UU435" bgcolor=#fefefe
| 0 ||  || MBA-I || 18.6 || data-sort-value="0.57" | 570 m || multiple || 2003–2021 || 11 Jun 2021 || 59 || align=left | — || 
|- id="2003 UV435" bgcolor=#d6d6d6
| 0 ||  || MBA-O || 17.1 || 2.1 km || multiple || 2003–2020 || 21 Jan 2020 || 46 || align=left | — || 
|- id="2003 UW435" bgcolor=#d6d6d6
| 0 ||  || MBA-O || 17.0 || 2.2 km || multiple || 2003–2019 || 27 Nov 2019 || 36 || align=left | — || 
|- id="2003 UX435" bgcolor=#FA8072
| 1 ||  || MCA || 18.6 || data-sort-value="0.57" | 570 m || multiple || 2003–2019 || 31 May 2019 || 40 || align=left | — || 
|- id="2003 UY435" bgcolor=#fefefe
| 0 ||  || MBA-I || 18.68 || data-sort-value="0.55" | 550 m || multiple || 2003–2021 || 29 Aug 2021 || 40 || align=left | — || 
|- id="2003 UZ435" bgcolor=#d6d6d6
| 0 ||  || MBA-O || 17.3 || 1.9 km || multiple || 2003–2019 || 19 Nov 2019 || 41 || align=left | — || 
|- id="2003 UB436" bgcolor=#d6d6d6
| 0 ||  || MBA-O || 17.09 || 2.1 km || multiple || 2003–2021 || 11 May 2021 || 66 || align=left | — || 
|- id="2003 UC436" bgcolor=#d6d6d6
| 0 ||  || MBA-O || 16.9 || 2.3 km || multiple || 2003–2020 || 21 Mar 2020 || 52 || align=left | — || 
|- id="2003 UD436" bgcolor=#fefefe
| 0 ||  || MBA-I || 18.49 || data-sort-value="0.60" | 600 m || multiple || 2003–2021 || 03 Apr 2021 || 48 || align=left | — || 
|- id="2003 UE436" bgcolor=#E9E9E9
| 2 ||  || MBA-M || 18.2 || data-sort-value="0.68" | 680 m || multiple || 1995–2019 || 28 Sep 2019 || 46 || align=left | Alt.: 1995 UV77 || 
|- id="2003 UF436" bgcolor=#d6d6d6
| 0 ||  || MBA-O || 16.98 || 2.2 km || multiple || 2003–2021 || 06 Apr 2021 || 71 || align=left | — || 
|- id="2003 UG436" bgcolor=#E9E9E9
| 0 ||  || MBA-M || 17.0 || 1.7 km || multiple || 2003–2020 || 17 Nov 2020 || 94 || align=left | — || 
|- id="2003 UH436" bgcolor=#d6d6d6
| 0 ||  || MBA-O || 17.53 || 1.7 km || multiple || 2003–2021 || 31 Mar 2021 || 66 || align=left | — || 
|- id="2003 UL436" bgcolor=#fefefe
| 1 ||  || MBA-I || 19.1 || data-sort-value="0.45" | 450 m || multiple || 2003–2019 || 01 Jun 2019 || 47 || align=left | — || 
|- id="2003 UM436" bgcolor=#fefefe
| 0 ||  || MBA-I || 18.0 || data-sort-value="0.75" | 750 m || multiple || 2003–2020 || 08 Nov 2020 || 57 || align=left | — || 
|- id="2003 UN436" bgcolor=#E9E9E9
| 1 ||  || MBA-M || 18.2 || data-sort-value="0.68" | 680 m || multiple || 2003–2021 || 18 Jan 2021 || 43 || align=left | — || 
|- id="2003 UO436" bgcolor=#E9E9E9
| 2 ||  || MBA-M || 18.3 || data-sort-value="0.65" | 650 m || multiple || 1995–2019 || 25 Sep 2019 || 41 || align=left | — || 
|- id="2003 UP436" bgcolor=#fefefe
| 0 ||  || MBA-I || 18.79 || data-sort-value="0.52" | 520 m || multiple || 2003–2021 || 01 Nov 2021 || 52 || align=left | — || 
|- id="2003 UQ436" bgcolor=#fefefe
| 0 ||  || MBA-I || 18.3 || data-sort-value="0.65" | 650 m || multiple || 2003–2020 || 23 Aug 2020 || 45 || align=left | — || 
|- id="2003 UR436" bgcolor=#E9E9E9
| 0 ||  || MBA-M || 18.00 || data-sort-value="0.75" | 750 m || multiple || 2003–2021 || 06 Apr 2021 || 50 || align=left | — || 
|- id="2003 US436" bgcolor=#d6d6d6
| 1 ||  || MBA-O || 16.9 || 2.3 km || multiple || 2003–2019 || 05 Nov 2019 || 35 || align=left | — || 
|- id="2003 UU436" bgcolor=#E9E9E9
| 1 ||  || MBA-M || 18.13 || data-sort-value="0.70" | 700 m || multiple || 2003–2021 || 03 Apr 2021 || 39 || align=left | — || 
|- id="2003 UV436" bgcolor=#fefefe
| 0 ||  || MBA-I || 18.4 || data-sort-value="0.62" | 620 m || multiple || 2003–2020 || 21 Apr 2020 || 43 || align=left | — || 
|- id="2003 UW436" bgcolor=#fefefe
| 0 ||  || MBA-I || 18.89 || data-sort-value="0.50" | 500 m || multiple || 2003–2018 || 03 Nov 2018 || 37 || align=left | — || 
|- id="2003 UX436" bgcolor=#d6d6d6
| 0 ||  || MBA-O || 17.0 || 2.2 km || multiple || 2003–2020 || 22 Jan 2020 || 47 || align=left | — || 
|- id="2003 UY436" bgcolor=#fefefe
| 0 ||  || MBA-I || 18.22 || data-sort-value="0.67" | 670 m || multiple || 2003–2021 || 13 May 2021 || 49 || align=left | — || 
|- id="2003 UZ436" bgcolor=#d6d6d6
| 1 ||  || MBA-O || 17.9 || 1.5 km || multiple || 2003–2018 || 14 Aug 2018 || 36 || align=left | — || 
|- id="2003 UA437" bgcolor=#d6d6d6
| 0 ||  || MBA-O || 17.6 || 1.7 km || multiple || 2003–2021 || 07 Jan 2021 || 33 || align=left | — || 
|- id="2003 UB437" bgcolor=#fefefe
| 0 ||  || MBA-I || 18.58 || data-sort-value="0.57" | 570 m || multiple || 2003–2021 || 07 Nov 2021 || 38 || align=left | — || 
|- id="2003 UD437" bgcolor=#E9E9E9
| 0 ||  || MBA-M || 17.3 || 1.0 km || multiple || 2003–2021 || 05 Jan 2021 || 47 || align=left | — || 
|- id="2003 UE437" bgcolor=#d6d6d6
| 1 ||  || HIL || 16.7 || 2.5 km || multiple || 2003–2019 || 08 Nov 2019 || 33 || align=left | — || 
|- id="2003 UF437" bgcolor=#fefefe
| 1 ||  || MBA-I || 19.02 || data-sort-value="0.47" | 470 m || multiple || 2003–2022 || 27 Jan 2022 || 46 || align=left | — || 
|- id="2003 UH437" bgcolor=#E9E9E9
| 3 ||  || MBA-M || 18.8 || data-sort-value="0.52" | 520 m || multiple || 2003–2019 || 27 Oct 2019 || 32 || align=left | — || 
|- id="2003 UK437" bgcolor=#d6d6d6
| 0 ||  || MBA-O || 17.0 || 2.2 km || multiple || 2003–2018 || 15 Sep 2018 || 31 || align=left | — || 
|- id="2003 UL437" bgcolor=#d6d6d6
| 0 ||  || MBA-O || 17.0 || 2.2 km || multiple || 2003–2019 || 08 Nov 2019 || 32 || align=left | — || 
|- id="2003 UM437" bgcolor=#E9E9E9
| 1 ||  || MBA-M || 17.6 || data-sort-value="0.90" | 900 m || multiple || 2003–2018 || 11 Jul 2018 || 37 || align=left | — || 
|- id="2003 UN437" bgcolor=#E9E9E9
| 0 ||  || MBA-M || 17.67 || 1.6 km || multiple || 2003–2021 || 11 Sep 2021 || 55 || align=left | — || 
|- id="2003 UO437" bgcolor=#E9E9E9
| 0 ||  || MBA-M || 17.84 || 1.5 km || multiple || 2003–2021 || 08 Sep 2021 || 45 || align=left | — || 
|- id="2003 UP437" bgcolor=#E9E9E9
| 0 ||  || MBA-M || 18.10 || 1.0 km || multiple || 2003–2022 || 26 Jan 2022 || 57 || align=left | — || 
|- id="2003 UR437" bgcolor=#E9E9E9
| 0 ||  || MBA-M || 17.74 || 1.6 km || multiple || 2003–2021 || 13 Sep 2021 || 39 || align=left | — || 
|- id="2003 US437" bgcolor=#E9E9E9
| 0 ||  || MBA-M || 17.73 || 1.6 km || multiple || 2003–2021 || 09 Oct 2021 || 50 || align=left | — || 
|- id="2003 UT437" bgcolor=#d6d6d6
| 0 ||  || MBA-O || 17.1 || 2.1 km || multiple || 2003–2018 || 12 Nov 2018 || 27 || align=left | — || 
|- id="2003 UU437" bgcolor=#fefefe
| 0 ||  || MBA-I || 18.6 || data-sort-value="0.57" | 570 m || multiple || 2003–2019 || 30 Aug 2019 || 158 || align=left | — || 
|- id="2003 UV437" bgcolor=#d6d6d6
| 0 ||  || MBA-O || 16.9 || 2.3 km || multiple || 2003–2020 || 25 Oct 2020 || 117 || align=left | — || 
|- id="2003 UW437" bgcolor=#d6d6d6
| 0 ||  || MBA-O || 15.92 || 3.6 km || multiple || 2003–2022 || 08 Jan 2022 || 155 || align=left | Alt.: 2010 CH190 || 
|- id="2003 UX437" bgcolor=#fefefe
| 0 ||  || MBA-I || 18.28 || data-sort-value="0.66" | 660 m || multiple || 2003–2021 || 14 Apr 2021 || 149 || align=left | — || 
|- id="2003 UA438" bgcolor=#d6d6d6
| 0 ||  || MBA-O || 16.43 || 2.9 km || multiple || 2003–2022 || 27 Jan 2022 || 94 || align=left | — || 
|- id="2003 UC438" bgcolor=#fefefe
| 0 ||  || MBA-I || 18.5 || data-sort-value="0.59" | 590 m || multiple || 2003–2019 || 24 Oct 2019 || 84 || align=left | — || 
|- id="2003 UD438" bgcolor=#d6d6d6
| 0 ||  || MBA-O || 17.0 || 2.2 km || multiple || 2003–2020 || 14 Dec 2020 || 72 || align=left | — || 
|- id="2003 UF438" bgcolor=#fefefe
| 0 ||  || MBA-I || 18.6 || data-sort-value="0.57" | 570 m || multiple || 2003–2021 || 11 Jan 2021 || 67 || align=left | — || 
|- id="2003 UG438" bgcolor=#E9E9E9
| 1 ||  || MBA-M || 17.7 || data-sort-value="0.86" | 860 m || multiple || 2003–2020 || 09 Dec 2020 || 81 || align=left | Alt.: 2010 LL118 || 
|- id="2003 UH438" bgcolor=#d6d6d6
| 0 ||  || MBA-O || 16.7 || 2.5 km || multiple || 1997–2020 || 10 Dec 2020 || 86 || align=left | — || 
|- id="2003 UJ438" bgcolor=#d6d6d6
| 0 ||  || MBA-O || 17.1 || 2.1 km || multiple || 2003–2021 || 16 Jan 2021 || 68 || align=left | — || 
|- id="2003 UK438" bgcolor=#fefefe
| 2 ||  || MBA-I || 19.2 || data-sort-value="0.43" | 430 m || multiple || 2003–2019 || 03 Oct 2019 || 54 || align=left | — || 
|- id="2003 UL438" bgcolor=#d6d6d6
| 0 ||  || MBA-O || 17.0 || 2.2 km || multiple || 2003–2019 || 22 Aug 2019 || 47 || align=left | — || 
|- id="2003 UM438" bgcolor=#d6d6d6
| 0 ||  || MBA-O || 16.7 || 2.5 km || multiple || 2003–2021 || 17 Jan 2021 || 58 || align=left | — || 
|- id="2003 UN438" bgcolor=#E9E9E9
| 0 ||  || MBA-M || 17.41 || 1.8 km || multiple || 2003–2021 || 08 Nov 2021 || 106 || align=left | — || 
|- id="2003 UO438" bgcolor=#d6d6d6
| 0 ||  || MBA-O || 16.7 || 2.5 km || multiple || 2002–2020 || 06 Dec 2020 || 60 || align=left | — || 
|- id="2003 UR438" bgcolor=#E9E9E9
| 0 ||  || MBA-M || 18.3 || data-sort-value="0.65" | 650 m || multiple || 2003–2021 || 07 Jan 2021 || 60 || align=left | — || 
|- id="2003 US438" bgcolor=#d6d6d6
| 0 ||  || MBA-O || 16.7 || 2.5 km || multiple || 2003–2020 || 08 Dec 2020 || 65 || align=left | — || 
|- id="2003 UT438" bgcolor=#E9E9E9
| 1 ||  || MBA-M || 18.2 || data-sort-value="0.68" | 680 m || multiple || 2003–2019 || 27 Sep 2019 || 76 || align=left | — || 
|- id="2003 UU438" bgcolor=#d6d6d6
| 0 ||  || MBA-O || 16.9 || 2.3 km || multiple || 2003–2020 || 14 Dec 2020 || 67 || align=left | — || 
|- id="2003 UV438" bgcolor=#E9E9E9
| 0 ||  || MBA-M || 18.0 || data-sort-value="0.75" | 750 m || multiple || 2003–2021 || 18 Jan 2021 || 60 || align=left | — || 
|- id="2003 UW438" bgcolor=#fefefe
| 0 ||  || MBA-I || 18.54 || data-sort-value="0.58" | 580 m || multiple || 2003–2021 || 13 Nov 2021 || 64 || align=left | — || 
|- id="2003 UX438" bgcolor=#fefefe
| 0 ||  || MBA-I || 18.4 || data-sort-value="0.62" | 620 m || multiple || 2003–2018 || 05 Oct 2018 || 47 || align=left | — || 
|- id="2003 UZ438" bgcolor=#fefefe
| 0 ||  || MBA-I || 17.9 || data-sort-value="0.78" | 780 m || multiple || 2003–2021 || 07 Jan 2021 || 48 || align=left | — || 
|- id="2003 UB439" bgcolor=#E9E9E9
| 0 ||  || MBA-M || 17.61 || data-sort-value="0.89" | 890 m || multiple || 2003–2021 || 07 Apr 2021 || 65 || align=left | — || 
|- id="2003 UC439" bgcolor=#d6d6d6
| 0 ||  || MBA-O || 16.88 || 2.3 km || multiple || 2003–2022 || 26 Jan 2022 || 72 || align=left | — || 
|- id="2003 UD439" bgcolor=#d6d6d6
| 0 ||  || MBA-O || 16.8 || 2.4 km || multiple || 2003–2021 || 04 Jan 2021 || 48 || align=left | — || 
|- id="2003 UE439" bgcolor=#d6d6d6
| 0 ||  || MBA-O || 16.5 || 2.8 km || multiple || 2003–2020 || 17 Nov 2020 || 72 || align=left | — || 
|- id="2003 UF439" bgcolor=#E9E9E9
| 0 ||  || MBA-M || 17.9 || data-sort-value="0.78" | 780 m || multiple || 2003–2019 || 28 Aug 2019 || 42 || align=left | — || 
|- id="2003 UG439" bgcolor=#E9E9E9
| 0 ||  || MBA-M || 18.0 || 1.1 km || multiple || 2003–2020 || 11 Dec 2020 || 73 || align=left | — || 
|- id="2003 UJ439" bgcolor=#d6d6d6
| 0 ||  || MBA-O || 16.6 || 2.7 km || multiple || 2003–2020 || 17 Nov 2020 || 84 || align=left | — || 
|- id="2003 UK439" bgcolor=#fefefe
| 0 ||  || MBA-I || 18.3 || data-sort-value="0.65" | 650 m || multiple || 2003–2021 || 10 Jan 2021 || 61 || align=left | — || 
|- id="2003 UL439" bgcolor=#fefefe
| 0 ||  || MBA-I || 18.6 || data-sort-value="0.57" | 570 m || multiple || 2003–2021 || 14 Jan 2021 || 52 || align=left | — || 
|- id="2003 UM439" bgcolor=#d6d6d6
| 0 ||  || MBA-O || 16.7 || 2.5 km || multiple || 2003–2019 || 24 Sep 2019 || 49 || align=left | — || 
|- id="2003 UO439" bgcolor=#E9E9E9
| 0 ||  || MBA-M || 17.6 || 1.3 km || multiple || 2003–2020 || 17 Oct 2020 || 72 || align=left | — || 
|- id="2003 UQ439" bgcolor=#E9E9E9
| 2 ||  || MBA-M || 18.2 || data-sort-value="0.68" | 680 m || multiple || 2003–2019 || 28 Aug 2019 || 37 || align=left | — || 
|- id="2003 UR439" bgcolor=#d6d6d6
| 0 ||  || MBA-O || 17.2 || 2.0 km || multiple || 2003–2019 || 04 Dec 2019 || 37 || align=left | — || 
|- id="2003 US439" bgcolor=#fefefe
| 0 ||  || MBA-I || 19.18 || data-sort-value="0.43" | 430 m || multiple || 2003–2021 || 07 Apr 2021 || 54 || align=left | — || 
|- id="2003 UT439" bgcolor=#E9E9E9
| 0 ||  || MBA-M || 17.97 || 1.4 km || multiple || 2001–2021 || 03 Aug 2021 || 51 || align=left | — || 
|- id="2003 UV439" bgcolor=#E9E9E9
| 0 ||  || MBA-M || 18.24 || data-sort-value="0.67" | 670 m || multiple || 2003–2021 || 02 Apr 2021 || 82 || align=left | — || 
|- id="2003 UW439" bgcolor=#fefefe
| 0 ||  || MBA-I || 18.0 || data-sort-value="0.75" | 750 m || multiple || 2003–2020 || 20 Dec 2020 || 72 || align=left | — || 
|- id="2003 UZ439" bgcolor=#E9E9E9
| 0 ||  || MBA-M || 18.4 || data-sort-value="0.62" | 620 m || multiple || 2003–2019 || 24 Aug 2019 || 41 || align=left | — || 
|- id="2003 UA440" bgcolor=#E9E9E9
| 0 ||  || MBA-M || 17.8 || 1.2 km || multiple || 2003–2020 || 20 Oct 2020 || 58 || align=left | — || 
|- id="2003 UB440" bgcolor=#d6d6d6
| 0 ||  || MBA-O || 17.45 || 1.8 km || multiple || 2003–2021 || 30 Jun 2021 || 37 || align=left | — || 
|- id="2003 UC440" bgcolor=#E9E9E9
| 0 ||  || MBA-M || 18.19 || 1.3 km || multiple || 2003–2021 || 13 Sep 2021 || 38 || align=left | — || 
|- id="2003 UE440" bgcolor=#d6d6d6
| 0 ||  || MBA-O || 16.7 || 2.5 km || multiple || 2003–2019 || 27 Nov 2019 || 37 || align=left | — || 
|- id="2003 UF440" bgcolor=#E9E9E9
| 0 ||  || MBA-M || 17.54 || 1.7 km || multiple || 2003–2021 || 13 Jul 2021 || 51 || align=left | — || 
|- id="2003 UH440" bgcolor=#fefefe
| 1 ||  || MBA-I || 18.8 || data-sort-value="0.52" | 520 m || multiple || 2003–2018 || 16 Jan 2018 || 30 || align=left | — || 
|- id="2003 UJ440" bgcolor=#fefefe
| 0 ||  || MBA-I || 18.75 || data-sort-value="0.53" | 530 m || multiple || 2003–2021 || 30 Jun 2021 || 41 || align=left | — || 
|- id="2003 UL440" bgcolor=#E9E9E9
| 0 ||  || MBA-M || 17.66 || 1.6 km || multiple || 2003–2021 || 28 Sep 2021 || 54 || align=left | — || 
|- id="2003 UM440" bgcolor=#d6d6d6
| 0 ||  || MBA-O || 16.2 || 3.2 km || multiple || 2003–2021 || 08 Jan 2021 || 98 || align=left | Alt.: 2010 DW71 || 
|- id="2003 UN440" bgcolor=#fefefe
| 0 ||  || MBA-I || 18.9 || data-sort-value="0.49" | 490 m || multiple || 2003–2019 || 25 May 2019 || 32 || align=left | — || 
|- id="2003 UO440" bgcolor=#d6d6d6
| 0 ||  || MBA-O || 16.99 || 2.2 km || multiple || 1995–2022 || 27 Jan 2022 || 49 || align=left | Alt.: 1995 GY4 || 
|- id="2003 UP440" bgcolor=#E9E9E9
| 0 ||  || MBA-M || 17.85 || 1.5 km || multiple || 2003–2021 || 30 Sep 2021 || 48 || align=left | — || 
|- id="2003 UQ440" bgcolor=#d6d6d6
| 0 ||  || MBA-O || 17.2 || 2.0 km || multiple || 2003–2019 || 24 Aug 2019 || 28 || align=left | — || 
|- id="2003 US440" bgcolor=#d6d6d6
| 0 ||  || MBA-O || 17.6 || 1.7 km || multiple || 2003–2019 || 24 Sep 2019 || 36 || align=left | — || 
|- id="2003 UT440" bgcolor=#fefefe
| 0 ||  || MBA-I || 19.1 || data-sort-value="0.45" | 450 m || multiple || 2003–2018 || 09 Nov 2018 || 22 || align=left | — || 
|- id="2003 UU440" bgcolor=#d6d6d6
| 0 ||  || MBA-O || 17.3 || 1.9 km || multiple || 2003–2020 || 14 Dec 2020 || 33 || align=left | Alt.: 2014 UZ39 || 
|- id="2003 UV440" bgcolor=#d6d6d6
| 0 ||  || MBA-O || 16.9 || 2.3 km || multiple || 2003–2019 || 19 Dec 2019 || 84 || align=left | — || 
|- id="2003 UW440" bgcolor=#d6d6d6
| 0 ||  || MBA-O || 16.8 || 2.4 km || multiple || 2003–2019 || 24 Dec 2019 || 69 || align=left | — || 
|- id="2003 UZ440" bgcolor=#E9E9E9
| 0 ||  || MBA-M || 18.1 || data-sort-value="0.71" | 710 m || multiple || 2003–2020 || 09 Dec 2020 || 61 || align=left | — || 
|- id="2003 UB441" bgcolor=#d6d6d6
| 0 ||  || MBA-O || 16.7 || 2.5 km || multiple || 2003–2019 || 17 Dec 2019 || 59 || align=left | Alt.: 2010 FT133 || 
|- id="2003 UD441" bgcolor=#d6d6d6
| 0 ||  || MBA-O || 17.1 || 2.1 km || multiple || 1992–2020 || 22 Dec 2020 || 58 || align=left | Alt.: 1992 SD10 || 
|- id="2003 UE441" bgcolor=#d6d6d6
| 0 ||  || MBA-O || 17.07 || 2.1 km || multiple || 2003–2021 || 14 Apr 2021 || 78 || align=left | — || 
|- id="2003 UF441" bgcolor=#fefefe
| 2 ||  || MBA-I || 19.1 || data-sort-value="0.45" | 450 m || multiple || 2003–2019 || 04 Dec 2019 || 49 || align=left | — || 
|- id="2003 UG441" bgcolor=#d6d6d6
| 0 ||  || MBA-O || 17.2 || 2.0 km || multiple || 2003–2020 || 21 Jan 2020 || 44 || align=left | — || 
|- id="2003 UH441" bgcolor=#fefefe
| 0 ||  || MBA-I || 18.8 || data-sort-value="0.52" | 520 m || multiple || 2003–2019 || 02 Oct 2019 || 67 || align=left | — || 
|- id="2003 UJ441" bgcolor=#fefefe
| 0 ||  || MBA-I || 17.74 || data-sort-value="0.84" | 840 m || multiple || 1999–2021 || 14 Apr 2021 || 73 || align=left | — || 
|- id="2003 UL441" bgcolor=#fefefe
| 0 ||  || MBA-I || 18.9 || data-sort-value="0.49" | 490 m || multiple || 2003–2019 || 25 Sep 2019 || 51 || align=left | — || 
|- id="2003 UM441" bgcolor=#d6d6d6
| 0 ||  || MBA-O || 16.8 || 2.4 km || multiple || 2003–2019 || 25 Oct 2019 || 39 || align=left | — || 
|- id="2003 UN441" bgcolor=#fefefe
| 0 ||  || MBA-I || 18.4 || data-sort-value="0.62" | 620 m || multiple || 2003–2020 || 24 Jun 2020 || 53 || align=left | — || 
|- id="2003 UO441" bgcolor=#d6d6d6
| 0 ||  || MBA-O || 17.5 || 1.8 km || multiple || 2003–2021 || 18 Jan 2021 || 47 || align=left | — || 
|- id="2003 UP441" bgcolor=#d6d6d6
| 0 ||  || MBA-O || 17.2 || 2.0 km || multiple || 2003–2020 || 15 Oct 2020 || 41 || align=left | — || 
|- id="2003 UQ441" bgcolor=#E9E9E9
| 0 ||  || MBA-M || 17.8 || data-sort-value="0.82" | 820 m || multiple || 2003–2020 || 26 Nov 2020 || 40 || align=left | — || 
|- id="2003 UR441" bgcolor=#E9E9E9
| 0 ||  || MBA-M || 17.0 || 1.7 km || multiple || 2003–2021 || 12 Jan 2021 || 170 || align=left | — || 
|- id="2003 US441" bgcolor=#d6d6d6
| 1 ||  || MBA-O || 17.1 || 2.1 km || multiple || 2003–2019 || 23 Oct 2019 || 37 || align=left | — || 
|- id="2003 UT441" bgcolor=#fefefe
| 0 ||  || MBA-I || 19.0 || data-sort-value="0.47" | 470 m || multiple || 2003–2019 || 24 Oct 2019 || 44 || align=left | — || 
|- id="2003 UV441" bgcolor=#E9E9E9
| 1 ||  || MBA-M || 18.0 || data-sort-value="0.75" | 750 m || multiple || 2003–2021 || 17 Jan 2021 || 43 || align=left | — || 
|- id="2003 UW441" bgcolor=#d6d6d6
| 0 ||  || MBA-O || 17.3 || 1.9 km || multiple || 2003–2019 || 03 Oct 2019 || 25 || align=left | — || 
|- id="2003 UX441" bgcolor=#fefefe
| 1 ||  || MBA-I || 19.2 || data-sort-value="0.43" | 430 m || multiple || 2003–2019 || 23 Oct 2019 || 31 || align=left | — || 
|- id="2003 UY441" bgcolor=#d6d6d6
| 1 ||  || MBA-O || 17.78 || 1.5 km || multiple || 2003–2019 || 20 Dec 2019 || 43 || align=left | Alt.: 2019 SB12 || 
|- id="2003 UC442" bgcolor=#d6d6d6
| 0 ||  || MBA-O || 17.2 || 2.0 km || multiple || 2003–2020 || 28 Jan 2020 || 84 || align=left | — || 
|- id="2003 UD442" bgcolor=#d6d6d6
| 0 ||  || MBA-O || 17.18 || 2.0 km || multiple || 2003–2021 || 09 Apr 2021 || 105 || align=left | Alt.: 2010 HJ4 || 
|- id="2003 UE442" bgcolor=#d6d6d6
| 0 ||  || MBA-O || 16.42 || 2.9 km || multiple || 2003–2022 || 27 Jan 2022 || 129 || align=left | Alt.: 2010 CY230 || 
|- id="2003 UG442" bgcolor=#d6d6d6
| 0 ||  || MBA-O || 17.3 || 1.9 km || multiple || 2003–2019 || 29 Oct 2019 || 58 || align=left | — || 
|- id="2003 UH442" bgcolor=#fefefe
| 0 ||  || MBA-I || 18.5 || data-sort-value="0.59" | 590 m || multiple || 2003–2019 || 28 Nov 2019 || 60 || align=left | — || 
|- id="2003 UJ442" bgcolor=#d6d6d6
| 0 ||  || MBA-O || 16.76 || 2.5 km || multiple || 2003–2021 || 15 May 2021 || 91 || align=left | — || 
|- id="2003 UL442" bgcolor=#E9E9E9
| 1 ||  || MBA-M || 18.2 || data-sort-value="0.68" | 680 m || multiple || 2003–2019 || 26 Sep 2019 || 48 || align=left | — || 
|- id="2003 UM442" bgcolor=#d6d6d6
| 0 ||  || MBA-O || 16.72 || 2.5 km || multiple || 2003–2021 || 02 Apr 2021 || 77 || align=left | — || 
|- id="2003 UN442" bgcolor=#d6d6d6
| 0 ||  || MBA-O || 17.27 || 2.0 km || multiple || 2003–2021 || 13 May 2021 || 92 || align=left | Alt.: 2010 GH196 || 
|- id="2003 UO442" bgcolor=#E9E9E9
| 0 ||  || MBA-M || 17.7 || 1.6 km || multiple || 2003–2020 || 21 Apr 2020 || 44 || align=left | — || 
|- id="2003 UP442" bgcolor=#fefefe
| 0 ||  || MBA-I || 18.2 || data-sort-value="0.68" | 680 m || multiple || 2003–2021 || 14 Jun 2021 || 69 || align=left | — || 
|- id="2003 UQ442" bgcolor=#fefefe
| 0 ||  || MBA-I || 18.4 || data-sort-value="0.62" | 620 m || multiple || 2003–2020 || 12 Sep 2020 || 43 || align=left | — || 
|- id="2003 UR442" bgcolor=#E9E9E9
| 0 ||  || MBA-M || 18.16 || data-sort-value="0.98" | 980 m || multiple || 2003–2021 || 09 Oct 2021 || 47 || align=left | — || 
|- id="2003 US442" bgcolor=#d6d6d6
| 0 ||  || MBA-O || 17.0 || 2.2 km || multiple || 2003–2019 || 03 Dec 2019 || 40 || align=left | — || 
|- id="2003 UT442" bgcolor=#d6d6d6
| 0 ||  || MBA-O || 16.8 || 2.4 km || multiple || 2003–2019 || 31 Oct 2019 || 43 || align=left | — || 
|- id="2003 UU442" bgcolor=#d6d6d6
| 1 ||  || MBA-O || 17.0 || 2.2 km || multiple || 2003–2020 || 23 Jan 2020 || 37 || align=left | — || 
|- id="2003 UV442" bgcolor=#d6d6d6
| 0 ||  || MBA-O || 17.73 || 1.6 km || multiple || 2003–2021 || 10 May 2021 || 52 || align=left | — || 
|- id="2003 UW442" bgcolor=#d6d6d6
| 1 ||  || MBA-O || 16.9 || 2.3 km || multiple || 2003–2019 || 20 Dec 2019 || 41 || align=left | — || 
|- id="2003 UX442" bgcolor=#FA8072
| 0 ||  || MCA || 19.0 || data-sort-value="0.47" | 470 m || multiple || 2003–2019 || 29 Nov 2019 || 50 || align=left | — || 
|- id="2003 UY442" bgcolor=#E9E9E9
| 0 ||  || MBA-M || 17.80 || 1.5 km || multiple || 2003–2021 || 12 Sep 2021 || 62 || align=left | — || 
|- id="2003 UZ442" bgcolor=#d6d6d6
| 0 ||  || MBA-O || 17.2 || 2.0 km || multiple || 2003–2019 || 26 Oct 2019 || 34 || align=left | — || 
|- id="2003 UB443" bgcolor=#d6d6d6
| 1 ||  || MBA-O || 17.6 || 1.7 km || multiple || 2003–2019 || 28 Dec 2019 || 40 || align=left | — || 
|- id="2003 UC443" bgcolor=#d6d6d6
| 0 ||  || MBA-O || 17.6 || 1.7 km || multiple || 2003–2020 || 22 Dec 2020 || 42 || align=left | — || 
|- id="2003 UD443" bgcolor=#E9E9E9
| 0 ||  || MBA-M || 17.82 || 1.5 km || multiple || 2003–2021 || 02 Oct 2021 || 72 || align=left | — || 
|- id="2003 UE443" bgcolor=#fefefe
| 0 ||  || MBA-I || 18.46 || data-sort-value="0.60" | 600 m || multiple || 2003–2021 || 30 Nov 2021 || 50 || align=left | — || 
|- id="2003 UF443" bgcolor=#E9E9E9
| 0 ||  || MBA-M || 18.16 || 1.3 km || multiple || 2003–2021 || 29 Oct 2021 || 55 || align=left | — || 
|- id="2003 UG443" bgcolor=#d6d6d6
| 0 ||  || MBA-O || 17.47 || 1.8 km || multiple || 2003–2021 || 12 Jun 2021 || 49 || align=left | — || 
|- id="2003 UH443" bgcolor=#d6d6d6
| 0 ||  || MBA-O || 16.8 || 2.4 km || multiple || 2003–2020 || 12 Dec 2020 || 75 || align=left | — || 
|- id="2003 UJ443" bgcolor=#E9E9E9
| 2 ||  || MBA-M || 19.1 || data-sort-value="0.45" | 450 m || multiple || 2003–2019 || 25 Jul 2019 || 43 || align=left | — || 
|- id="2003 UK443" bgcolor=#E9E9E9
| 1 ||  || MBA-M || 17.8 || 1.2 km || multiple || 2003–2019 || 05 May 2019 || 43 || align=left | — || 
|- id="2003 UL443" bgcolor=#E9E9E9
| 0 ||  || MBA-M || 18.1 || 1.0 km || multiple || 2001–2020 || 11 Dec 2020 || 101 || align=left | — || 
|- id="2003 UM443" bgcolor=#E9E9E9
| 0 ||  || MBA-M || 17.56 || 1.7 km || multiple || 2003–2021 || 07 Sep 2021 || 56 || align=left | — || 
|- id="2003 UN443" bgcolor=#d6d6d6
| 0 ||  || MBA-O || 17.04 || 2.2 km || multiple || 2003–2021 || 13 Apr 2021 || 66 || align=left | Alt.: 2010 HT68 || 
|- id="2003 UP443" bgcolor=#d6d6d6
| 1 ||  || HIL || 16.5 || 2.8 km || multiple || 2003–2019 || 04 Nov 2019 || 32 || align=left | — || 
|- id="2003 UQ443" bgcolor=#fefefe
| 0 ||  || MBA-I || 18.8 || data-sort-value="0.52" | 520 m || multiple || 2001–2018 || 29 Nov 2018 || 34 || align=left | — || 
|- id="2003 UR443" bgcolor=#fefefe
| 1 ||  || MBA-I || 18.9 || data-sort-value="0.49" | 490 m || multiple || 2003–2019 || 19 Dec 2019 || 33 || align=left | — || 
|- id="2003 UT443" bgcolor=#d6d6d6
| 0 ||  || MBA-O || 17.18 || 2.0 km || multiple || 2003–2022 || 25 Jan 2022 || 48 || align=left | — || 
|- id="2003 UU443" bgcolor=#d6d6d6
| 0 ||  || MBA-O || 17.8 || 1.5 km || multiple || 2003–2021 || 16 Jan 2021 || 32 || align=left | — || 
|- id="2003 UV443" bgcolor=#d6d6d6
| 0 ||  || MBA-O || 17.4 || 1.8 km || multiple || 2003–2021 || 18 Jan 2021 || 39 || align=left | — || 
|- id="2003 UW443" bgcolor=#E9E9E9
| 0 ||  || MBA-M || 17.64 || 1.7 km || multiple || 2003–2021 || 26 Nov 2021 || 48 || align=left | — || 
|- id="2003 UX443" bgcolor=#E9E9E9
| 2 ||  || MBA-M || 18.3 || data-sort-value="0.65" | 650 m || multiple || 2003–2019 || 24 Dec 2019 || 27 || align=left | — || 
|- id="2003 UY443" bgcolor=#E9E9E9
| 3 ||  || MBA-M || 18.0 || data-sort-value="0.75" | 750 m || multiple || 2003–2020 || 17 Dec 2020 || 30 || align=left | — || 
|- id="2003 UZ443" bgcolor=#E9E9E9
| 0 ||  || MBA-M || 18.72 || 1.0 km || multiple || 2003–2021 || 26 Nov 2021 || 68 || align=left | — || 
|- id="2003 UA444" bgcolor=#E9E9E9
| 0 ||  || MBA-M || 17.2 || 1.1 km || multiple || 2003–2020 || 23 Dec 2020 || 54 || align=left | — || 
|- id="2003 UB444" bgcolor=#fefefe
| 2 ||  || MBA-I || 19.5 || data-sort-value="0.37" | 370 m || multiple || 2003–2016 || 27 Aug 2016 || 34 || align=left | — || 
|- id="2003 UC444" bgcolor=#d6d6d6
| 0 ||  || MBA-O || 16.7 || 2.5 km || multiple || 2000–2021 || 12 Jan 2021 || 81 || align=left | —Added on 22 July 2020 || 
|- id="2003 UD444" bgcolor=#d6d6d6
| 3 ||  || MBA-O || 18.6 || 1.1 km || multiple || 2003–2019 || 26 Sep 2019 || 19 || align=left | —Added on 22 July 2020 || 
|- id="2003 UE444" bgcolor=#d6d6d6
| 1 ||  || MBA-O || 17.77 || 1.6 km || multiple || 2003–2021 || 08 May 2021 || 43 || align=left | —Added on 22 July 2020 || 
|- id="2003 UF444" bgcolor=#d6d6d6
| 0 ||  || MBA-O || 17.20 || 2.0 km || multiple || 2003–2021 || 15 Apr 2021 || 73 || align=left | —Added on 22 July 2020 || 
|- id="2003 UG444" bgcolor=#d6d6d6
| 1 ||  || MBA-O || 17.6 || 1.7 km || multiple || 2003–2018 || 06 Oct 2018 || 37 || align=left | —Added on 22 July 2020 || 
|- id="2003 UH444" bgcolor=#E9E9E9
| 0 ||  || MBA-M || 18.75 || data-sort-value="0.99" | 990 m || multiple || 2003–2021 || 06 Nov 2021 || 50 || align=left | —Added on 22 July 2020 || 
|- id="2003 UJ444" bgcolor=#d6d6d6
| 1 ||  || MBA-O || 16.6 || 2.7 km || multiple || 2003–2019 || 28 Dec 2019 || 35 || align=left | —Added on 22 July 2020 || 
|- id="2003 UK444" bgcolor=#fefefe
| 0 ||  || MBA-I || 18.77 || data-sort-value="0.52" | 520 m || multiple || 2003–2021 || 31 Oct 2021 || 90 || align=left | —Added on 22 July 2020 || 
|- id="2003 UL444" bgcolor=#E9E9E9
| 0 ||  || MBA-M || 17.9 || 1.1 km || multiple || 2003–2020 || 11 Dec 2020 || 92 || align=left | —Added on 22 July 2020 || 
|- id="2003 UN444" bgcolor=#d6d6d6
| 0 ||  || MBA-O || 17.4 || 1.8 km || multiple || 2003–2021 || 18 Jan 2021 || 60 || align=left | —Added on 22 July 2020 || 
|- id="2003 UO444" bgcolor=#E9E9E9
| 0 ||  || MBA-M || 17.84 || 1.5 km || multiple || 2003–2022 || 06 Jan 2022 || 90 || align=left | —Added on 22 July 2020 || 
|- id="2003 UP444" bgcolor=#E9E9E9
| 2 ||  || MBA-M || 18.4 || data-sort-value="0.62" | 620 m || multiple || 2003–2019 || 03 Oct 2019 || 35 || align=left | —Added on 22 July 2020 || 
|- id="2003 UQ444" bgcolor=#E9E9E9
| 0 ||  || MBA-M || 18.16 || data-sort-value="0.98" | 980 m || multiple || 2001–2022 || 25 Jan 2022 || 58 || align=left | —Added on 24 August 2020 || 
|- id="2003 UR444" bgcolor=#E9E9E9
| 0 ||  || MBA-M || 17.42 || 1.8 km || multiple || 2001–2021 || 10 Nov 2021 || 91 || align=left | —Added on 24 August 2020 || 
|- id="2003 UT444" bgcolor=#fefefe
| 0 ||  || HUN || 19.02 || data-sort-value="0.47" | 470 m || multiple || 2003–2021 || 12 Dec 2021 || 74 || align=left | Disc.: Spacewatch Added on 13 September 2020 || 
|- id="2003 UU444" bgcolor=#FA8072
| 0 ||  || MCA || 19.0 || data-sort-value="0.47" | 470 m || multiple || 2003–2020 || 15 Aug 2020 || 36 || align=left | Disc.: NEATAdded on 19 October 2020 || 
|- id="2003 UV444" bgcolor=#E9E9E9
| 0 ||  || MBA-M || 17.7 || 1.2 km || multiple || 2003–2020 || 10 Sep 2020 || 61 || align=left | Disc.: SpacewatchAdded on 19 October 2020 || 
|- id="2003 UW444" bgcolor=#d6d6d6
| 0 ||  || MBA-O || 16.65 || 2.6 km || multiple || 2003–2021 || 29 Nov 2021 || 93 || align=left | Disc.: SpacewatchAdded on 19 October 2020 || 
|- id="2003 UX444" bgcolor=#fefefe
| 0 ||  || MBA-I || 19.0 || data-sort-value="0.47" | 470 m || multiple || 2003–2020 || 20 Oct 2020 || 81 || align=left | Disc.: SpacewatchAdded on 19 October 2020 || 
|- id="2003 UY444" bgcolor=#d6d6d6
| 0 ||  || MBA-O || 16.28 || 3.1 km || multiple || 2003–2022 || 25 Jan 2022 || 79 || align=left | Disc.: SpacewatchAdded on 19 October 2020 || 
|- id="2003 UZ444" bgcolor=#d6d6d6
| 0 ||  || MBA-O || 17.3 || 1.9 km || multiple || 2003–2020 || 14 Nov 2020 || 52 || align=left | Disc.: LPL/Spacewatch IIAdded on 19 October 2020 || 
|- id="2003 UA445" bgcolor=#E9E9E9
| 0 ||  || MBA-M || 17.91 || 1.5 km || multiple || 1998–2021 || 17 Aug 2021 || 53 || align=left | Disc.: LPL/Spacewatch IIAdded on 19 October 2020 || 
|- id="2003 UB445" bgcolor=#E9E9E9
| 0 ||  || MBA-M || 17.91 || 1.5 km || multiple || 2003–2021 || 27 Nov 2021 || 73 || align=left | Disc.: SpacewatchAdded on 19 October 2020 || 
|- id="2003 UC445" bgcolor=#E9E9E9
| 0 ||  || MBA-M || 17.33 || 1.4 km || multiple || 2003–2021 || 31 Oct 2021 || 41 || align=left | Disc.: SpacewatchAdded on 19 October 2020 || 
|- id="2003 UD445" bgcolor=#E9E9E9
| 0 ||  || MBA-M || 17.3 || 1.5 km || multiple || 2003–2020 || 10 Nov 2020 || 40 || align=left | Disc.: Kitt Peak Obs.Added on 19 October 2020Alt.: 2015 OW79 || 
|- id="2003 UE445" bgcolor=#fefefe
| 0 ||  || MBA-I || 18.67 || data-sort-value="0.55" | 550 m || multiple || 2003–2021 || 02 Dec 2021 || 70 || align=left | Disc.: SpacewatchAdded on 19 October 2020 || 
|- id="2003 UF445" bgcolor=#E9E9E9
| 0 ||  || MBA-M || 18.00 || 1.1 km || multiple || 2003–2022 || 27 Jan 2022 || 45 || align=left | Disc.: LPL/Spacewatch IIAdded on 19 October 2020 || 
|- id="2003 UG445" bgcolor=#fefefe
| 0 ||  || MBA-I || 18.5 || data-sort-value="0.59" | 590 m || multiple || 2003–2018 || 15 Oct 2018 || 43 || align=left | Disc.: SpacewatchAdded on 19 October 2020Alt.: 2003 SQ106, 2013 HF77 || 
|- id="2003 UH445" bgcolor=#fefefe
| 2 ||  || MBA-I || 18.7 || data-sort-value="0.54" | 540 m || multiple || 2003–2017 || 24 Oct 2017 || 28 || align=left | Disc.: LPL/Spacewatch IIAdded on 19 October 2020 || 
|- id="2003 UJ445" bgcolor=#E9E9E9
| 1 ||  || MBA-M || 18.80 || data-sort-value="0.97" | 970 m || multiple || 2003–2021 || 01 Dec 2021 || 20 || align=left | Disc.: SpacewatchAdded on 19 October 2020 || 
|- id="2003 UK445" bgcolor=#E9E9E9
| 1 ||  || MBA-M || 18.32 || 1.2 km || multiple || 2003–2021 || 03 Oct 2021 || 41 || align=left | Disc.: SpacewatchAdded on 19 October 2020 || 
|- id="2003 UM445" bgcolor=#E9E9E9
| 0 ||  || MBA-M || 17.78 || 1.5 km || multiple || 2003–2021 || 06 Nov 2021 || 76 || align=left | Disc.: SpacewatchAdded on 19 October 2020 || 
|- id="2003 UN445" bgcolor=#E9E9E9
| 0 ||  || MBA-M || 17.9 || 1.1 km || multiple || 2003–2020 || 15 Dec 2020 || 62 || align=left | Disc.: SpacewatchAdded on 17 January 2021 || 
|- id="2003 UO445" bgcolor=#d6d6d6
| 0 ||  || MBA-O || 17.14 || 2.1 km || multiple || 2003–2022 || 08 Jan 2022 || 53 || align=left | Disc.: SpacewatchAdded on 17 January 2021Alt.: 2010 CW7 || 
|- id="2003 UP445" bgcolor=#d6d6d6
| 0 ||  || MBA-O || 17.55 || 1.7 km || multiple || 2003–2022 || 25 Jan 2022 || 46 || align=left | Disc.: SpacewatchAdded on 17 January 2021 || 
|- id="2003 UQ445" bgcolor=#E9E9E9
| 0 ||  || MBA-M || 18.0 || 1.1 km || multiple || 2003–2020 || 06 Dec 2020 || 39 || align=left | Disc.: SDSSAdded on 17 January 2021 || 
|- id="2003 UR445" bgcolor=#d6d6d6
| 2 ||  || MBA-O || 17.1 || 2.1 km || multiple || 2003–2020 || 20 Dec 2020 || 33 || align=left | Disc.: SpacewatchAdded on 17 January 2021 || 
|- id="2003 UT445" bgcolor=#d6d6d6
| 0 ||  || MBA-O || 16.59 || 2.7 km || multiple || 2003–2021 || 12 Nov 2021 || 100 || align=left | Disc.: SpacewatchAdded on 17 January 2021Alt.: 2010 EU10 || 
|- id="2003 UU445" bgcolor=#E9E9E9
| 1 ||  || MBA-M || 18.1 || 1.0 km || multiple || 2003–2020 || 17 Nov 2020 || 88 || align=left | Disc.: SpacewatchAdded on 17 January 2021 || 
|- id="2003 UV445" bgcolor=#d6d6d6
| 0 ||  || MBA-O || 17.54 || 1.7 km || multiple || 2003–2021 || 08 Dec 2021 || 30 || align=left | Disc.: Pan-STARRSAdded on 17 January 2021 || 
|- id="2003 UW445" bgcolor=#E9E9E9
| 0 ||  || MBA-M || 18.1 || 1.0 km || multiple || 2003–2020 || 15 Sep 2020 || 31 || align=left | Disc.: SpacewatchAdded on 17 January 2021 || 
|- id="2003 UX445" bgcolor=#E9E9E9
| 1 ||  || MBA-M || 18.7 || data-sort-value="0.76" | 760 m || multiple || 2003–2020 || 12 Sep 2020 || 31 || align=left | Disc.: SpacewatchAdded on 17 January 2021 || 
|- id="2003 UY445" bgcolor=#d6d6d6
| 0 ||  || MBA-O || 17.17 || 2.0 km || multiple || 2003–2022 || 09 Jan 2022 || 52 || align=left | Disc.: SpacewatchAdded on 17 January 2021 || 
|- id="2003 UZ445" bgcolor=#d6d6d6
| 2 ||  || MBA-O || 17.8 || 1.5 km || multiple || 2003–2019 || 27 Oct 2019 || 22 || align=left | Disc.: LPL/Spacewatch IIAdded on 17 January 2021 || 
|- id="2003 UA446" bgcolor=#E9E9E9
| 0 ||  || MBA-M || 18.5 || data-sort-value="0.84" | 840 m || multiple || 2003–2020 || 17 Oct 2020 || 65 || align=left | Disc.: SpacewatchAdded on 17 January 2021 || 
|- id="2003 UB446" bgcolor=#E9E9E9
| 0 ||  || MBA-M || 17.6 || 1.3 km || multiple || 2003–2020 || 09 Dec 2020 || 46 || align=left | Disc.: LPL/Spacewatch IIAdded on 17 January 2021 || 
|- id="2003 UC446" bgcolor=#d6d6d6
| 0 ||  || MBA-O || 16.7 || 2.5 km || multiple || 2003–2020 || 11 Dec 2020 || 75 || align=left | Disc.: SpacewatchAdded on 17 January 2021 || 
|- id="2003 UD446" bgcolor=#d6d6d6
| 0 ||  || MBA-O || 17.4 || 1.8 km || multiple || 2003–2020 || 22 Jan 2020 || 42 || align=left | Disc.: SpacewatchAdded on 17 January 2021 || 
|- id="2003 UE446" bgcolor=#d6d6d6
| 0 ||  || MBA-O || 17.1 || 2.1 km || multiple || 2003–2021 || 12 Jan 2021 || 35 || align=left | Disc.: SDSSAdded on 17 January 2021 || 
|- id="2003 UF446" bgcolor=#d6d6d6
| 0 ||  || MBA-O || 17.6 || 1.7 km || multiple || 2003–2021 || 05 Jan 2021 || 58 || align=left | Disc.: SpacewatchAdded on 17 January 2021 || 
|- id="2003 UG446" bgcolor=#d6d6d6
| 0 ||  || MBA-O || 16.64 || 2.6 km || multiple || 2003–2022 || 10 Jan 2022 || 57 || align=left | Disc.: SpacewatchAdded on 17 January 2021 || 
|- id="2003 UH446" bgcolor=#E9E9E9
| 0 ||  || MBA-M || 17.7 || 1.2 km || multiple || 2003–2020 || 11 Dec 2020 || 89 || align=left | Disc.: SpacewatchAdded on 17 January 2021 || 
|- id="2003 UJ446" bgcolor=#d6d6d6
| 0 ||  || MBA-O || 16.7 || 2.5 km || multiple || 2003–2021 || 07 Feb 2021 || 76 || align=left | Disc.: SDSSAdded on 17 January 2021 || 
|- id="2003 UK446" bgcolor=#fefefe
| 0 ||  || MBA-I || 18.8 || data-sort-value="0.52" | 520 m || multiple || 2003–2020 || 19 Aug 2020 || 38 || align=left | Disc.: SpacewatchAdded on 17 January 2021 || 
|- id="2003 UL446" bgcolor=#fefefe
| 1 ||  || MBA-I || 19.5 || data-sort-value="0.37" | 370 m || multiple || 2003–2018 || 06 Oct 2018 || 29 || align=left | Disc.: SDSSAdded on 17 January 2021 || 
|- id="2003 UM446" bgcolor=#E9E9E9
| 1 ||  || MBA-M || 19.57 || data-sort-value="0.51" | 510 m || multiple || 2003–2021 || 06 Jan 2021 || 29 || align=left | Disc.: SDSSAdded on 17 January 2021 || 
|- id="2003 UN446" bgcolor=#d6d6d6
| 0 ||  || MBA-O || 16.8 || 2.4 km || multiple || 2003–2021 || 06 Jan 2021 || 70 || align=left | Disc.: SpacewatchAdded on 17 January 2021 || 
|- id="2003 UO446" bgcolor=#d6d6d6
| 1 ||  || MBA-O || 17.3 || 1.9 km || multiple || 2003–2020 || 20 Dec 2020 || 62 || align=left | Disc.: LPL/Spacewatch IIAdded on 17 January 2021 || 
|- id="2003 UP446" bgcolor=#E9E9E9
| 1 ||  || MBA-M || 19.0 || data-sort-value="0.67" | 670 m || multiple || 2003–2020 || 08 Dec 2020 || 60 || align=left | Disc.: SpacewatchAdded on 17 January 2021 || 
|- id="2003 UQ446" bgcolor=#d6d6d6
| 1 ||  || MBA-O || 17.16 || 2.1 km || multiple || 2003–2021 || 05 Jan 2021 || 38 || align=left | Disc.: SpacewatchAdded on 17 January 2021 || 
|- id="2003 UA447" bgcolor=#E9E9E9
| 1 ||  || MBA-M || 17.7 || 1.2 km || multiple || 1999–2020 || 05 Nov 2020 || 35 || align=left | Disc.: SDSSAdded on 17 January 2021 || 
|- id="2003 UB447" bgcolor=#fefefe
| 0 ||  || MBA-I || 18.9 || data-sort-value="0.49" | 490 m || multiple || 2003–2020 || 16 Nov 2020 || 41 || align=left | Disc.: SpacewatchAdded on 17 January 2021 || 
|- id="2003 UC447" bgcolor=#d6d6d6
| 0 ||  || MBA-O || 17.5 || 1.8 km || multiple || 2003–2020 || 14 Nov 2020 || 37 || align=left | Disc.: SpacewatchAdded on 17 January 2021 || 
|- id="2003 UD447" bgcolor=#d6d6d6
| 0 ||  || MBA-O || 17.4 || 1.8 km || multiple || 2003–2021 || 11 Jan 2021 || 35 || align=left | Disc.: SDSSAdded on 17 January 2021 || 
|- id="2003 UE447" bgcolor=#E9E9E9
| 0 ||  || MBA-M || 18.4 || data-sort-value="0.88" | 880 m || multiple || 1996–2021 || 09 Jan 2021 || 72 || align=left | Disc.: SpacewatchAdded on 17 January 2021 || 
|- id="2003 UF447" bgcolor=#d6d6d6
| 1 ||  || MBA-O || 17.6 || 1.7 km || multiple || 2003–2020 || 10 Dec 2020 || 34 || align=left | Disc.: LPL/Spacewatch IIAdded on 17 January 2021 || 
|- id="2003 UG447" bgcolor=#E9E9E9
| 0 ||  || MBA-M || 17.8 || 1.2 km || multiple || 2003–2021 || 07 Jan 2021 || 65 || align=left | Disc.: NEATAdded on 9 March 2021 || 
|- id="2003 UH447" bgcolor=#E9E9E9
| 0 ||  || MBA-M || 17.5 || data-sort-value="0.94" | 940 m || multiple || 2003–2021 || 16 Jan 2021 || 71 || align=left | Disc.: SpacewatchAdded on 9 March 2021 || 
|- id="2003 UJ447" bgcolor=#d6d6d6
| 0 ||  || MBA-O || 17.11 || 2.1 km || multiple || 2003–2022 || 27 Jan 2022 || 60 || align=left | Disc.: SDSSAdded on 9 March 2021 || 
|- id="2003 UK447" bgcolor=#E9E9E9
| 2 ||  || MBA-M || 18.3 || 1.2 km || multiple || 2003–2019 || 02 Jun 2019 || 18 || align=left | Disc.: Kitt Peak Obs.Added on 9 March 2021 || 
|- id="2003 UL447" bgcolor=#fefefe
| 0 ||  || MBA-I || 19.24 || data-sort-value="0.42" | 420 m || multiple || 2003–2021 || 31 Oct 2021 || 28 || align=left | Disc.: Kitt Peak Obs.Added on 9 March 2021 || 
|- id="2003 UM447" bgcolor=#E9E9E9
| 1 ||  || MBA-M || 18.3 || data-sort-value="0.65" | 650 m || multiple || 2003–2021 || 16 Jan 2021 || 30 || align=left | Disc.: SpacewatchAdded on 9 March 2021 || 
|- id="2003 UN447" bgcolor=#E9E9E9
| 0 ||  || MBA-M || 17.6 || data-sort-value="0.90" | 900 m || multiple || 2003–2021 || 16 Jan 2021 || 53 || align=left | Disc.: SpacewatchAdded on 9 March 2021 || 
|- id="2003 UO447" bgcolor=#d6d6d6
| 1 ||  || MBA-O || 17.0 || 2.2 km || multiple || 2003–2020 || 12 Dec 2020 || 31 || align=left | Disc.: SpacewatchAdded on 9 March 2021 || 
|- id="2003 UP447" bgcolor=#fefefe
| 4 ||  || MBA-I || 19.1 || data-sort-value="0.45" | 450 m || multiple || 2003–2020 || 10 Nov 2020 || 20 || align=left | Disc.: SpacewatchAdded on 9 March 2021 || 
|- id="2003 UQ447" bgcolor=#E9E9E9
| 1 ||  || MBA-M || 18.2 || data-sort-value="0.96" | 960 m || multiple || 2003–2020 || 08 Dec 2020 || 28 || align=left | Disc.: SpacewatchAdded on 11 May 2021 || 
|- id="2003 UR447" bgcolor=#d6d6d6
| 3 ||  || MBA-O || 17.1 || 2.1 km || multiple || 2003–2020 || 04 Dec 2020 || 23 || align=left | Disc.: SpacewatchAdded on 11 May 2021 || 
|- id="2003 US447" bgcolor=#E9E9E9
| 3 ||  || MBA-M || 18.5 || data-sort-value="0.84" | 840 m || multiple || 2003–2020 || 10 Dec 2020 || 17 || align=left | Disc.: SpacewatchAdded on 11 May 2021 || 
|- id="2003 UT447" bgcolor=#fefefe
| 1 ||  || HUN || 17.9 || data-sort-value="0.78" | 780 m || multiple || 2003–2021 || 01 Jun 2021 || 68 || align=left | Disc.: LONEOSAdded on 11 May 2021 || 
|- id="2003 UU447" bgcolor=#fefefe
| 1 ||  || MBA-I || 18.7 || data-sort-value="0.54" | 540 m || multiple || 2003–2020 || 15 Oct 2020 || 28 || align=left | Disc.: SpacewatchAdded on 11 May 2021 || 
|- id="2003 UV447" bgcolor=#fefefe
| 0 ||  || MBA-I || 18.9 || data-sort-value="0.49" | 490 m || multiple || 2003–2021 || 15 Apr 2021 || 40 || align=left | Disc.: SDSSAdded on 5 November 2021 || 
|- id="2003 UZ447" bgcolor=#fefefe
| 3 ||  || MBA-I || 18.7 || data-sort-value="0.54" | 540 m || multiple || 2003–2014 || 25 Oct 2014 || 28 || align=left | Disc.: SpacewatchAdded on 17 June 2021 || 
|- id="2003 UA448" bgcolor=#E9E9E9
| 1 ||  || MBA-M || 18.1 || 1.0 km || multiple || 2003–2020 || 08 Nov 2020 || 16 || align=left | Disc.: SpacewatchAdded on 17 June 2021 || 
|- id="2003 UB448" bgcolor=#d6d6d6
| 3 ||  || MBA-O || 17.6 || 1.7 km || multiple || 2000–2013 || 03 Dec 2013 || 21 || align=left | Disc.: SpacewatchAdded on 17 June 2021 || 
|- id="2003 UC448" bgcolor=#E9E9E9
| 1 ||  || MBA-M || 18.33 || data-sort-value="0.91" | 910 m || multiple || 2003–2021 || 29 Nov 2021 || 35 || align=left | Disc.: SDSSAdded on 21 August 2021 || 
|- id="2003 UH448" bgcolor=#E9E9E9
| 0 ||  || MBA-M || 18.0 || data-sort-value="0.75" | 750 m || multiple || 2003–2019 || 08 Sep 2019 || 39 || align=left | Disc.: LPL/Spacewatch IIAdded on 21 August 2021 || 
|- id="2003 UJ448" bgcolor=#E9E9E9
| 4 ||  || MBA-M || 18.7 || data-sort-value="0.76" | 760 m || multiple || 2003–2016 || 26 Oct 2016 || 16 || align=left | Disc.: LPL/Spacewatch IIAdded on 21 August 2021 || 
|- id="2003 UK448" bgcolor=#d6d6d6
| 0 ||  || HIL || 16.2 || 3.2 km || multiple || 1995–2018 || 03 Nov 2018 || 45 || align=left | Disc.: Spacewatch Added on 21 August 2021 || 
|- id="2003 UM448" bgcolor=#E9E9E9
| 0 ||  || MBA-M || 17.61 || 1.7 km || multiple || 2003–2021 || 01 Oct 2021 || 59 || align=left | Disc.: SpacewatchAdded on 21 August 2021 || 
|- id="2003 UN448" bgcolor=#fefefe
| 0 ||  || MBA-I || 19.3 || data-sort-value="0.41" | 410 m || multiple || 2003–2019 || 01 Jun 2019 || 33 || align=left | Disc.: LPL/Spacewatch IIAdded on 21 August 2021 || 
|- id="2003 UE449" bgcolor=#E9E9E9
| 0 ||  || MBA-M || 18.3 || 1.2 km || multiple || 2001–2021 || 11 Sep 2021 || 36 || align=left | Disc.: SDSSAdded on 30 September 2021 || 
|- id="2003 UF449" bgcolor=#fefefe
| 0 ||  || MBA-I || 18.8 || data-sort-value="0.52" | 520 m || multiple || 2003–2021 || 13 Sep 2021 || 31 || align=left | Disc.: Kitt Peak Obs.Added on 30 September 2021 || 
|- id="2003 UG449" bgcolor=#E9E9E9
| 3 ||  || MBA-M || 17.8 || 1.5 km || multiple || 2003–2020 || 14 Aug 2020 || 14 || align=left | Disc.: Kitt Peak Obs.Added on 30 September 2021 || 
|- id="2003 UH449" bgcolor=#fefefe
| 0 ||  || MBA-I || 18.94 || data-sort-value="0.48" | 480 m || multiple || 2003–2021 || 06 Nov 2021 || 43 || align=left | Disc.: SDSSAdded on 5 November 2021 || 
|- id="2003 UJ449" bgcolor=#E9E9E9
| 1 ||  || MBA-M || 19.48 || data-sort-value="0.71" | 710 m || multiple || 2003–2021 || 09 Nov 2021 || 58 || align=left | Disc.: SpacewatchAdded on 5 November 2021 || 
|- id="2003 UK449" bgcolor=#E9E9E9
| 0 ||  || MBA-M || 17.82 || 1.5 km || multiple || 2001–2021 || 27 Nov 2021 || 72 || align=left | Disc.: SpacewatchAdded on 5 November 2021 || 
|- id="2003 UL449" bgcolor=#E9E9E9
| 0 ||  || MBA-M || 18.15 || 1.3 km || multiple || 2003–2021 || 27 Nov 2021 || 73 || align=left | Disc.: SDSSAdded on 5 November 2021 || 
|- id="2003 UM449" bgcolor=#fefefe
| 0 ||  || MBA-I || 18.46 || data-sort-value="0.60" | 600 m || multiple || 2003–2021 || 03 Oct 2021 || 34 || align=left | Disc.: SpacewatchAdded on 5 November 2021 || 
|- id="2003 UN449" bgcolor=#fefefe
| 0 ||  || MBA-I || 19.26 || data-sort-value="0.42" | 420 m || multiple || 2003–2021 || 26 Nov 2021 || 55 || align=left | Disc.: SpacewatchAdded on 5 November 2021 || 
|- id="2003 UO449" bgcolor=#E9E9E9
| 0 ||  || MBA-M || 17.43 || 1.8 km || multiple || 2003–2021 || 27 Nov 2021 || 104 || align=left | Disc.: SDSSAdded on 5 November 2021 || 
|- id="2003 UP449" bgcolor=#E9E9E9
| 2 ||  || MBA-M || 17.6 || 1.7 km || multiple || 2003–2021 || 23 Oct 2021 || 33 || align=left | Disc.: SpacewatchAdded on 5 November 2021 || 
|- id="2003 UQ449" bgcolor=#E9E9E9
| 1 ||  || MBA-M || 18.45 || 1.1 km || multiple || 2003–2021 || 25 Nov 2021 || 52 || align=left | Disc.: SpacewatchAdded on 5 November 2021 || 
|- id="2003 UR449" bgcolor=#fefefe
| 0 ||  || MBA-I || 18.99 || data-sort-value="0.47" | 470 m || multiple || 2003–2021 || 09 Nov 2021 || 49 || align=left | Disc.: SpacewatchAdded on 5 November 2021 || 
|- id="2003 US449" bgcolor=#E9E9E9
| 1 ||  || MBA-M || 18.76 || data-sort-value="0.99" | 990 m || multiple || 2002–2021 || 09 Nov 2021 || 44 || align=left | Disc.: SpacewatchAdded on 5 November 2021 || 
|- id="2003 UT449" bgcolor=#fefefe
| 0 ||  || MBA-I || 18.73 || data-sort-value="0.53" | 530 m || multiple || 2003–2021 || 06 Nov 2021 || 34 || align=left | Disc.: Kitt Peak Obs.Added on 5 November 2021 || 
|- id="2003 UU449" bgcolor=#d6d6d6
| 0 ||  || MBA-O || 16.98 || 2.2 km || multiple || 2003–2021 || 29 Apr 2021 || 55 || align=left | Disc.: SDSSAdded on 24 December 2021 || 
|- id="2003 UV449" bgcolor=#E9E9E9
| 1 ||  || MBA-M || 18.63 || 1.0 km || multiple || 2003–2021 || 02 Dec 2021 || 70 || align=left | Disc.: SDSSAdded on 24 December 2021 || 
|- id="2003 UW449" bgcolor=#E9E9E9
| 0 ||  || MBA-M || 17.82 || 1.5 km || multiple || 2003–2021 || 02 Dec 2021 || 48 || align=left | Disc.: SpacewatchAdded on 24 December 2021 || 
|- id="2003 UX449" bgcolor=#fefefe
| 0 ||  || MBA-I || 19.31 || data-sort-value="0.41" | 410 m || multiple || 2003–2021 || 28 Nov 2021 || 31 || align=left | Disc.: SpacewatchAdded on 24 December 2021 || 
|- id="2003 UZ449" bgcolor=#FA8072
| 0 ||  || HUN || 18.9 || data-sort-value="0.49" | 490 m || multiple || 2003–2021 || 02 Dec 2021 || 37 || align=left | Disc.: SpacewatchAdded on 24 December 2021 || 
|- id="2003 UA450" bgcolor=#d6d6d6
| 0 ||  || MBA-O || 16.74 || 2.5 km || multiple || 2003–2021 || 14 Apr 2021 || 66 || align=left | Disc.: NEATAdded on 24 December 2021 || 
|- id="2003 UB450" bgcolor=#fefefe
| 0 ||  || MBA-I || 19.4 || data-sort-value="0.39" | 390 m || multiple || 2003–2021 || 10 Aug 2021 || 21 || align=left | Disc.: SDSSAdded on 29 January 2022 || 
|- id="2003 UC450" bgcolor=#d6d6d6
| 2 ||  || MBA-O || 17.9 || 1.5 km || multiple || 2003–2016 || 31 Mar 2016 || 14 || align=left | Disc.: Kitt Peak Obs.Added on 29 January 2022 || 
|- id="2003 UD450" bgcolor=#E9E9E9
| 0 ||  || MBA-M || 17.3 || 1.0 km || multiple || 2003–2021 || 17 Jan 2021 || 50 || align=left | Disc.: SpacewatchAdded on 29 January 2022 || 
|- id="2003 UE450" bgcolor=#E9E9E9
| 0 ||  || MBA-M || 17.7 || 1.6 km || multiple || 2003–2021 || 30 Sep 2021 || 36 || align=left | Disc.: No observationsAdded on 29 January 2022 || 
|}
back to top

References 
 

Lists of unnumbered minor planets